Grow House is a 2017 American stoner comedy film written and directed by DJ Pooh, starring DeRay Davis, Lil Duval, Snoop Dogg, Faizon Love and Malcolm McDowell. The film premiered at the Fox Bruin Theater on April 17, 2017, and was released on April 20 (4/20)

Plot
Two stoners, Pat (DeRay Davis) and Darius (Lil Duval) embark on a plan to grow marijuana and sell it to dispensaries. Unfortunately, the two know how to smoke weed, but not how to grow it.

Cast

 Malcolm McDowell as Dr. Doobie
 Snoop Dogg as himself
 DeRay Davis as Pat
 Lil Duval as Darius
 Faizon Love as Rollin' Reg
 Zulay Henao as Madison
 Raquel Lee as Terri
 Martin Starr as Conspiracy Chris
 Lin Shaye as Mrs. Gilliam
 Charlamagne Tha God as Black Jesus
 Alice Hunter as Kirby
 Shawn Fonteno as Bam

Soundtrack
Grow House (Original Motion Picture Soundtrack), containing hip hop music, was released on April 20, 2017 via Grow Room Productions. It features contributions from Snoop Dogg, Lil Duval, Wiz Khalifa, Cypress Hill, Curt Chambers, Devin the Dude, Fredwreck, Garrick Grout, Kurupt, Money Hungry, Wyann Vaughn and Xzibit. KJ Conteh-produced "Kush Ups" previosly appeared on Snoop Dogg's 2016 album Coolaid with music video was directed by Dan Folger. Music video for "Kill 'Em Wit The Shoulders" was released in 2016. Music video for DJ Muggs-produced "Reefer Man" was directed by Anthony Hayward; the song was later included in Elephants on Acid. The song "420 (Blaze Up)" was also appeared in Neva Left.

Track listing

References

External links

 
 
 

2017 films
Stoner films
2017 in cannabis
2017 comedy films
2010s American films
2010s buddy comedy films
American buddy comedy films
2010s English-language films
African-American comedy films
American films about cannabis